Verkehrshaus-Lido landing stage is a landing stage in the city of Lucerne, Switzerland. It is located on Lake Lucerne, across the bay from main part of Lucerne. It is served by the Lake Lucerne Navigation Company. The port is adjacent to the Swiss Museum of Transport; rail connections are available at Luzern Verkehrshaus railway station, on the far side of the museum.

Services 
 the following services stop at Verkehrshaus-Lido:

 Lake Lucerne Navigation Company:
 hourly service between Luzern Bahnhofquai and Brunnen; some ships continue from Brunnen to Flüelen.
 during the summer months, five round-trips per day between Luzern Bahnhofquai and Alpnachstad
 during the summer months, three round-trips per day between Luzern Bahnhofquai and Küssnacht am Rigi
 during the summer months, three round-trips per day between Luzern Bahnhofquai and Meggenhorn

References

External links 
 

Ferry terminals in Switzerland
Transport in Lucerne